60 Minutes is an American news television program which premiered on CBS in 1968.

60 Minutes or Sixty Minutes may also refer to:

 60 Minutes II, also known as 60 Minutes Wednesday and 60 Minutes, a second edition of the CBS News program which ran from 1999 to 2005
 60 Minutes (Australian TV program), an Australian news television program, based on the American program of the same title, that premiered in 1979
 60 Minutes (New Zealand  TV program), a New Zealand newsmagazine television program, based on the American program of the same title, that premiered in 1993
 Sixty Minutes (UK TV programme), a short-lived British evening news programme which ran on BBC from 1983 until 1984

See also
 60 Minute Man (architecture)
 Hour, a unit of time measured by 60 minutes